Cartmeticup is a rural locality in the Great Southern region of Western Australia. It has a population of 55 as of 2016, with a total of 16 families.

References

Towns in Western Australia
Great Southern (Western Australia)